Yirol Airport is an airport in South Sudan. It has a single unpaved runway.

Location
Yirol Airport  is located in Yirol West County in Eastern Lakes State, in the town of Yirol, in the central part of South Sudan. The airport is located to the immediate north of the central business district of the town.

The geographic coordinates of this airport are: 6° 33' 36.60"N, 30° 30' 36.00"E (Latitude:6.5600; Longitude:30.5100).

Overview
Yirol Airport is a small civilian airport that serves the town of Yirol and surrounding communities. The airport does not yet have regular scheduled airline service.

Accidents
In September 2018 a Let L-410 Turbolet aeroplane on final approach to land at the airport lost contact with controllers. The aircraft was found to have crashed into nearby Lake Yirol. It is thought that the pilots became disorientated in fog. There were 23 people on board the aircraft, of whom 20 were killed, including both pilots. The passengers killed included a Red Cross official, a government representative, two army officers, and the Bishop of Yirol, the Rt Revd Simon Adut Yuang.

Initial reports stated that four people had survived, including two children and an Italian doctor. Some other reports stated there were three survivors, who were two young children and an Italian doctor. Several days after the crash the South Sudanese government stated that 20 people had died, and three had survived, one of whom was a flight attendant.

See also
 Yirol
 Lakes State
 List of airports in South Sudan

References

External links
  Location of Yirol Airport At Google Maps

Airports in South Sudan
Lakes (state)
Bahr el Ghazal